Dighton High School, also known as Dighton Jr/Sr High School (DJSHS), is a public secondary school in Dighton, Kansas and a part of Dighton Unified School District 482. Its building, Lane County Community High School, located at 200 S. Wichita Ave., was built in 1938.  It was listed on the National Register of Historic Places in 2005.

It is a Public Works Administration (PWA) project and it is Art Deco in style.  Glen H. Thomas of Wichita was the architect and the contractor was M.C. Foy.

References

External links

 Dighton High School

Public high schools in Kansas
Public middle schools in Kansas
School buildings on the National Register of Historic Places in Kansas
Art Deco architecture in Kansas
School buildings completed in 1938
Buildings and structures in Lane County, Kansas